Blackhawk Lake is a lake in Dakota County, in the U.S. state of Minnesota.

According to Warren Upham, Blackhawk Lake is probably an English translation of the Sioux language name.

See also
List of lakes in Minnesota

References

Lakes of Minnesota
Lakes of Dakota County, Minnesota